Blackstones or Blackstone's may refer to:

 The Blackstones, UK-based reggae vocal trio active since the mid-1970s
 Blackstones F.C., non-league football club from Stamford, England
 Blackstone's Commentaries, Commentaries on the Laws of England
 Blackstone's Department Store, Los Angeles 
 Blackstone's formulation, a principle of criminal law
 Blackstone & Co, a diesel engine and agricultural engineering company in Stamford, Lincolnshire, that became Mirrlees Blackstone
 Black Stones, short for Almighty Black P. Stone Nation, a Chicago gang, also known as Blackstone Rangers
 Black Stones, a band in the manga series Nana

See also
Black Rock (disambiguation)
Blackstone (disambiguation)